Marlene Mary Herbert Goldsmith (29 September 1942 – 13 April 2000) was an Australian politician. She was a Liberal member of the New South Wales Legislative Council.

Born Marlene Herbert in Gunnedah to parents Cecil and Esme, and  brothers Warwick and Mark. Marlene studied to be a teacher, receiving a Bachelor of Arts  She received a Commonwealth Scholarship in 1960. resulting in teaching at St. Mary's College, Gunnedah where she was held in high regard.  She was then awarded a teaching scholarship to the University of Minnesota in 1978 (and a PhD), and a Thurston Scholarship in Foundations of Education in 1981. She taught in both the United States and in New South Wales, and was also a research consultant. She married Ian Goldsmith, with whom she had a daughter. She was also a branch president of the Liberal Party.

In 1988, Marlene Goldsmith was elected to the New South Wales Legislative Council as a Liberal member. She held her seat until her retirement in 1999. She died from cancer on 13 April 2000. A Requiem mass was held for her at St Canice's Church in Elizabeth Bay on 19 April 2000.

References

 

1942 births
2000 deaths
University of Minnesota alumni
Liberal Party of Australia members of the Parliament of New South Wales
Members of the New South Wales Legislative Council
20th-century Australian politicians
Women members of the New South Wales Legislative Council
20th-century Australian women politicians